The Corelli International Academic School of the Arts  was an independent co-educational art-focused school in Browns Bay, Auckland, New Zealand founded in 2001. The school was a member of the Independent Schools of New Zealand (ISNZ).  It went into receivership in 2016.

References

External links

Private schools in New Zealand
Art schools in New Zealand